The designation His Majesty's Canadian Ship (HMCS;  [NCSM]), is applied as a prefix to surface ships in the Royal Canadian Navy and Canadian Joint Operations Command. The similar designation of His Majesty's Canadian Submarine is applied to submarine vessels.

Etymology
The title is derived from His Majesty's Ship (HMS), used in the United Kingdom. The person who is monarch of Canada is also equally and separately the monarch of the United Kingdom of Great Britain and Northern Ireland.

Various Commonwealth realms use derivative variations to designate their warships, such as His Majesty's Australian Ship (HMAS) and His Majesty's New Zealand Ship (HMNZS).

In the reign of a queen, the designation changes to Her Majesty's Canadian Ship; the French version of the title remains unchanged in this instance.

Usage

After the formation of Naval Service of Canada in 1910, warships were given the prefix HMCS with the "C" representing Canadian as a way to differentiate Canadian from British warships. It was initially the only concession the British Admiralty made following the formation of the Canadian naval service.  was the first ship with the HMCS designation after being transferred from the British Royal Navy to Canada, commissioned on 4 August 1910.  became the first Canadian ship commissioned under a Queen during March 1952.

Shore maintenance and mooring facilities bear the name His Majesty's Canadian Dockyard (HMC Dockyard) (in French  or ).

See also 

 Hull classification symbol (Canada)
 List of current ships of the Royal Canadian Navy
 Monarchy of Canada and the Canadian Armed Forces
 Stone frigate

Citations

Sources
 
 

Royal Canadian Navy
Monarchy in Canada
Ship prefixes